Salimbene di Adam, O.F.M., (or Salimbene of Parma) (9 October 1221 –  1290) was an Italian Franciscan friar, theologian, and chronicler who is a  source for Italian history of the 13th century.

Life

He was born in Parma, the son of Guido di Adam, a crusader. His father's first cousin, Berardo  Oliverio di Adam, died in the battle of San Cesario in 1229. Salimbene was a follower of Joachim de Fiore, and a believer in his apocalyptic teachings.  Salimbene joined the Franciscan order in 1238 at the friary of Fano.

He then led a life of wandering, avoiding his father who did not wish him to join the Order, and visited Pisa and other Italian towns; then in 1247 he was sent to Lyon, and visited Paris, Ferrara Cremona, Troyes, Florence, Ravenna, Genoa, Reggio and the friary of Montefalcone (near San Polo d'Enza in the region of Emilia-Romagna).  The last was the probable site of his death.

Works

Salimbene's main work was his Cronica ("Chronicle"), covering the years 1167–1287.  It was begun around 1282 and begins with the founding of Alessandria.  His extensive travels meant that he met many important people of the time including Frederick II, Holy Roman Emperor, Louis IX of France and Pope Innocent IV. He was a friend of Filippo da Pistoia. He also describes everyday life vividly and gives numerous details of internal disputes in the Franciscan order at the time.

He also wrote The Twelve Calamities of Emperor Frederick II and several treatises now lost. "The Twelve Calamities" is set up as a kind of servant's narrative (Exempla, examples), made to demonstrate the faults of Frederick II - often with loosely fitted biblical quotations.  One of the major themes of the work is Salimbene's emphasis on numerology. The chronicle itself is set up to demonstrate the parallel between the ten plagues and the ten calamities of Frederick II (conveniently he tacked on the last two after the parallel).  Emphasizing the Christian nature of his narrative and the non-Christian nature of Frederick, Salimbene turns a phrase used during the crusades claiming that “if he had been a good Catholic and had loved God, the Church, and his own soul, he would scarcely have had an equal as an emperor in the world.”

Notes

Further reading
 Salimbene de Adam, Cronica, nuova ed. critica, a cura di Giuseppe Scalia (Bari: Laterza, 1966)
 The Chronicle of Salimbene de Adam ed. by J.L. Baird, G. Baglivi & J.R. Kane (Binghamton, N.Y.; Medieval & Renaissance Texts & Studies, 1986)

External links

Excerpt from the Chronicle of Salimbene on Frederick II, "as translated and paraphrased by G. Coulton"
 (Latin text)
 (Latin text)
Cronica, Ferdinando Bernini, Bari, 1942; scan of the complete text.

1221 births
1290 deaths
Writers from Parma
Italian Friars Minor
Franciscan scholars
Italian chroniclers
13th-century Italian historians
Frederick II, Holy Roman Emperor